Jefferson Silva dos Santos (born May 10, 1995), better known as Jefferson Baiano, is a Brazilian football player. He plays for Zweigen Kanazawa from 2023 in Japan.

Career
On 7 February 2018, Baiano abroad to Japan and signed to J2 club, Mito HollyHock on loan. He scored a team high 11 goals, but he left from Mito after a season at his club.

On 24 December 2018, Baiano was loaned again to J2 club, Montedio Yamagata from 2019. but, he left from the club after a season in Yamagata.

On 25 December 2022, Baiano return to Japan after two years and announcement officially transfer to J2 club, Zweigen Kanazawa from CE Arraial do Cabo for upcoming 2023 season, previously he played with 2 different teams in J2 League, Mito HollyHock and Montedio Yamagata in 2018 and 2019 respectively.

Career statistics
Updated to the start from 2023 season.

Club

References

External links

1995 births
Living people
Brazilian footballers
Brazilian expatriate footballers
Campeonato Brasileiro Série B players
Campeonato Brasileiro Série C players
J2 League players
Saudi First Division League players
K League 2 players
Galícia Esporte Clube players
Esporte Clube Jacuipense players
Associação Atlética Santa Rita players
Agremiação Sportiva Arapiraquense players
Red Bull Bragantino players
Mito HollyHock players
Montedio Yamagata players
Zweigen Kanazawa players
Al-Mujazzal Club players
Bucheon FC 1995 players
Al Hala SC players
Hoang Anh Gia Lai FC players
Association football forwards
Expatriate footballers in Japan
Expatriate footballers in Saudi Arabia
Expatriate footballers in South Korea
Expatriate footballers in Bahrain
Expatriate footballers in Vietnam
Brazilian expatriate sportspeople in Japan
Brazilian expatriate sportspeople in Saudi Arabia
Brazilian expatriate sportspeople in South Korea
Brazilian expatriate sportspeople in Bahrain
Brazilian expatriate sportspeople in Vietnam